Doody, a variant of O'Dowd (Ó Dubhda), is a surname of Irish heritage. It originated in the Kingdom of Uí Fiachrach Muaidhe as the name of the ruling dynasty. It may refer to:

People
 Alison Doody (born 1966), Irish actress and model
 C. William Doody (1931–2005), Canadian politician
 Edward Doody (1903−1968), Australian Roman Catholic bishop
 Jonathan Doody (born 1974), Thai mass murderer in 1991 Arizona shooting
 Margaret Doody (born 1939), Canadian writer of historical detective fiction, feminist literary critic and professor of literature
 Martha M. Vertreace-Doody (born 1945), American poet and author
 Michael Doody, Canadian politician
 Nick Doody (born 1972), British stand-up comedian
 Pat Doody (1938–1990), British broadcaster
 Patrick Doody (born 1992), American retired soccer player
 Patrick H. Doody (1840–1924), Irish soldier in the American Civil War awarded the Medal of Honor
 Rachel Doody (born 1984), New Zealand retired footballer
 Samuel Doody (1656–1706), English botanist
 Terrence Doody (born 1943), American literary scholar
 Ryan Doody (born 1996), American Filmmaker

Fictional characters
 the title puppet character of Howdy Doody, an American children's TV series
 Doody Cubee, the orange female Cubee from the British children’s show, Cubeez
 Doody, a character in the 1978 film Grease (film)